Alpine Lake is an unincorporated community located in Preston County, West Virginia, United States.

References

External links
 Alpine Lake Community Website

Unincorporated communities in Preston County, West Virginia
Unincorporated communities in West Virginia
Morgantown metropolitan area